Wojsławice may refer to the following places in Poland:
Wojsławice, Lower Silesian Voivodeship (south-west Poland)
Wojsławice, Lublin Voivodeship (east Poland)
Wojsławice, Zduńska Wola County in Łódź Voivodeship (central Poland)
Wojsławice, Kazimierza County in Świętokrzyskie Voivodeship (south-central Poland)
Wojsławice, Pińczów County in Świętokrzyskie Voivodeship (south-central Poland)
Wojsławice, Masovian Voivodeship (east-central Poland)
Wojsławice, Silesian Voivodeship (south Poland)
Wojsławice, Lubusz Voivodeship (west Poland)
Wojsławice, Opole Voivodeship (south-west Poland)
Wojsławice, West Pomeranian Voivodeship (north-west Poland)